Natural law is law that exists independently of the positive law of a given political order, society or nation-state.

Natural law may also refer to:

 "Natural Law" (Star Trek: Voyager), a Star Trek: Voyager episode
 Natural-law argument, an argument for the existence of God
 Natural Law Party, a trans-national union of political parties, with national branches in over 80 countries
Natural Law Party of Canada
Natural Law Party (Ireland)
Natural Law Party of Israel
Natural Law Party of New Zealand
Natural Law Party of Ontario
Natural Law Party of Quebec
Natural Law Party (Trinidad and Tobago)
Natural Law Party (United States)
Scientific law, statements based on experimental observations that describe some aspect of the world

See also
Law of nature (disambiguation)
Crime against nature (disambiguation)